The Women’s Army Corps Service Medal was a military award of the United States Army which was created on July 29, 1943 by  issued by President Franklin Roosevelt.  The medal was intended to recognize the service of women to the Army during the Second World War.  The profile featured on the medal is that of the goddess Pallas Athena; the same profile was used for the Women's Army Corps branch insignia.

The Women’s Army Corps Service Medal was awarded to any service member  of the Women's Army Auxiliary Corps between July 10, 1942 and August 31, 1943 or the Women's Army Corps between September 1, 1943 and September 2, 1945. The medal was issued as a once-awarded medal, and there are no devices authorized for additional presentations.  The medal ranked in order of precedence below the American Defense Service Medal and above the American Campaign Medal.

The Women’s Army Corps Service Medal is considered obsolete as the United States Army is a combined service and no longer maintains any separate service corps for women, although it may still be worn by those who served.

See also
Awards and decorations of the United States military

References

American women  in World War II
Awards and decorations of the United States Army
Awards honoring women
Awards established in 1943
Military awards and decorations of World War II
Women in the United States Army
Service Medal